Berlandiera lyrata, with the common names chocolate flower, chocolate daisy, or lyreleaf greeneyes, is a North American species of flowering plant in the family Asteraceae. The common name lyreleaf greeneyes is a reference to the shape of the leaf, which is curved like a lyre and the green disc which is left behind when the ray florets drop off which is thought to look like an eye.

Description

When the plant freezes, the roots will preserve its life. The velvety leaves are pinnately lobed or scalloped. In areas that freeze, the flowers bloom at night from spring until frost. In frost-free areas, it will bloom year-round (typically April to October). Around mid-morning, the flowers close or drop. As it gets hotter, the flower begins to turn white and the ray florets begin to drop, leaving the green disc shape. The seed-like fruit is scaleless and hairless at the tip.

Distribution and habitat
In the United States, the species is native to Colorado, Kansas, Oklahoma, Arizona, New Mexico, Texas, and Arkansas. In Mexico, it is native to Chihuahua, Coahuila, Nuevo León, San Luis Potosí, Durango, Sonora, Zacatecas, Aguascalientes and Jalisco. It can usually be found in grassy areas and rocky soil.

Cultivation
B. lyrata is a hardy perennial, cultivated as an ornamental plant. It is grown in gardens for the chocolate-like scent of its flowers. The chocolate odor can also be produced by plucking the ray florets from the flower head. To ensure that it will continue to bloom as long as possible, spent flowers should be removed.

It grows best in full sun locations. It is native to soil types that are dry, shallow and rocky such as sandy loams and limestone soils. It is known to grow along roadsides and in grasslands in the southwest US. It is drought-tolerant. In heavy, wet soils, B. lyrata is subject to root rot. B. lyrata can be planted in areas that are mowed frequently and can be mowed itself.

The plant is propagated through seeds which can be collected from the plant itself and germinated outdoors from spring to fall.

Uses 
The flower head is known to attract beneficial insects to the garden.

The stamens have a chocolate flavor and are edible. The plant was also used by Native Americans to alleviate symptoms of stomach problems. Some Native American cultures would burn the dried roots of the plant in order to treat nervous conditions or to inspire courage.

References

External links

lyrata
Night-blooming plants
Flora of North America
Garden plants of North America
Plants described in 1839